Haji Jabir (born 1976) is an Eritrean novelist and journalist. He was born in the city of Massawa on the Red Sea coast. Writing in Arabic, he has published five novels until 2021. With the nomination of Black Foam (2018), Jabir became the first Eritrean novelist to be longlisted for the International Prize for Arabic Fiction.

Life and career 
Jaber’s literary work deals with the past and present of Eritrea, its diaspora and the wider Horn of Africa. His novel Black Foam, based on real events, tells the fictional story of a group of Ethiopian Jews, who emigrate to Israel to escape poverty and in search of a better life. In 2023, it was published in an English translation by Sawad Hussain and Marcia Lynx Qualey.  

Jaber lives in Doha, Qatar, and works as a journalist for Al Jazeera. He has also taught courses for creative writing at the Al Jazeera Media Institute. In an interview with ArabLit magazine, he said:

Works
 Samrawit (2012), winner of the Sharjah Award for Arab Creativity in 2012
 Fatma's Harbour (2013), translated into Italian
 The Spindle Game (2015), longlisted for the 2016 Sheikh Zayed Book Award 
 Black Foam (2018), winner of the Katara Novel Prize in 2019, and longlisted for the International Prize for Arabic Fiction
The Abyssinian Rimbaud (2021)

References

External links 

 An excerpt from Haji Jaber’s ‘The Spindle Game' in English translation

 A chapter from the novel Black Foam, translated by Nancy Roberts

Eritrean writers
1976 births
Living people
Arabic-language writers